Eime is a municipality in the district of Hildesheim in Lower Saxony, Germany.

References

External links
Website of Eime  

Hildesheim (district)